A sett is the underground home or den of a family of badgers, usually consisting of a network of tunnels.

Sett or SETT may also refer to:

 Sett (paving), a shaped piece of rock used to make hard surfaces for roads
 The Submarine Escape Training Tower at HMS Dolphin, Gosport, England
 The River Sett, a river in Derbyshire, England
 Sett, the pattern of colored threads or yarns that make of up the distinctive plaid of a Scottish tartan
 Mining sett, a legal arrangement used to manage the exploitation of land for the extraction of tin
 Sett, a fictional creature in the animated television series Hellsing
 Meskwaki Settlement, Iowa, called the "Sett" by residents
 Sett (surname)

See also 

 Sette (disambiguation)
 Set (disambiguation)